The Omnificent English Dictionary In Limerick Form (The OEDILF) is an open collaborative project to compile an English dictionary whose entries take the form of limericks. The project was originally called the "Oxford English Dictionary in Limerick Form," but the name was changed after the OED legal department advised against it. The site, launched in May 2004, has attracted over 2,200 writers from around the world. As of July 2021, the project has amassed more than 113,000 limericks. The project progresses alphabetically and is currently accepting limericks on words beginning with the letters Aa- through Ha-.

In July 2021, the estimated date of completion of The OEDILF was 3 Nov 2063. This will be a "first edition", a first pass through words in the English language. Work will move on to limericks for words that were skipped in the first pass and for words that were coined during the writing of the first edition.

The OEDILF has been featured on National Public Radio in the United States, on BBC Radio 4 in the UK, on CBC radio in Canada, and in the pages of the Washington Post, the Glasgow Herald, and various other newspapers. It was also named one of PC Magazine's  Top 99 Undiscovered Websites of 2006.

A sense of contributions
The project was initiated in 2004 by Chris J. Strolin. With the assistance of contributors, by July 2021 the project had amassed more than 113,000 limericks. Strolin has set a personal goal of writing at least one limerick per day, and by July 2021 he had created 9,480 limericks. The project's most prolific writer topped 11,000 limericks, 21 others have written more than 1,000, and the contributions of some 150 other "OEDILFers" range from 100 to 900 limericks each. Many have written a handful, and new authors are welcome.

References

External links 
The Omnificent English Dictionary In Limerick Form
PC Magazine's Top 99 Undiscovered Websites of 2006
The Herald, Glasgow, 20 January 2007
Word of Mouth, BBC Radio 4, 9 May 2006
Weekend Edition, NPR, 25 December 2004
Washington Post Style Invitational contests in August 2004, August 2005, August 2006, August 2007 August 2008
As it Happens  CBC Radio interview, 23 December 2008

Internet properties established in 2004
Online English dictionaries